Dr. Norman Bethune Collegiate Institute (also known as Bethune, BCI, or Dr. Norman Bethune CI) is a high school in Toronto, Ontario, Canada. It is located in the Steeles neighbourhood of the former suburb of Scarborough. It was founded in 1979 and named after Norman Bethune, a Canadian doctor and communist who served under the Eighth Route Army. The school is attended by over 1000 students, most of whom speak a primary language other than English, the language of instruction. Bethune is also partners with the neighboring senior's homes: Mon Sheong and Tendercare, and with Beijing#15 High School in Beijing, People's Republic of China.

School Information 
Students taking Modern Language classes are offered opportunities, including outings to French and Spanish movies, theatre productions and restaurants. Senior students may travel abroad to France and Spain. 
Math: General Math 9-11, Data Management, Advanced Functions, and Calculus and Vectors

Students can choose from visual art, photography, computer art, dramatic arts vocal music, and repertoire instrumental music and strings. Outside the classroom, students can join the art club, the drama club, or the music council.

The school's T-Wing features a woodshop, an autoshop, and an electronics lab. The school also has several computer labs. Students may participate by choosing technology courses or by joining the many clubs involving the technology department. These clubs include Programming Club, or Electronics Club.
Stellar Program
The Stellar Program is an enrichment program for grade 9 and 10 in Math and Science.

This program is no longer offered at the school starting in the 2019-2020 school year.

School Programs 
English as a Second Language (ESL)
Bethune's ESL program features field trips that promote Canadian culture and experiential learning. The semestered program has 5 levels in addition to ESL sensitive courses in Geography and History. Bilingual classroom helpers, full-time settlement workers, peer mentor programs, the Chinese Association, and the Newcomer Orientation Week in August help to ease the transition to Canada and to Bethune. In addition to after-school and week-end support classes, OSSLT preparation classes and peer-tutoring support ESL students throughout the year.
Individual Education Plan (IEP)
A variety of special education programs and services are offered to meet the needs of all students, including students with exceptionalities, such as behavioural, communication, intellectual, physical and multiple learning disabilities. Students' exceptionalities are identified through a formal review process undertaken by an Identification, Placement and Review Committee (IPRC).

Co-curricular activities 
More information about Bethune's co-curricular activities can be found on the school's clubs and extracurriculars website.

Student Leadership Groups 

 The Student Administrative Council (SAC) coordinates extra-curricular activities within the school.
 Bethune Blaze is the technology team at Bethune and is in charge of audio-visual productions.
 The Bethune ESL Mentor program helps newcomers with English and adaptation to Canada and provides mentorship in academic studies.
 Bethune REPs are the representatives of Bethune and help set up and run events such as parent nights.
 The Athletic Bears Council (ABC) organizes all athletic events within the school.
 Bethune Journal is the school newspaper that delivers current news and opinion columns every few months.
 The Bethune Music Council (BMC) is responsible for organizing events related to the music program at Bethune, such as retreats, banquets and various music trips.
The Bethune Creative Arts Council (BCAC) organizes and brings awareness to events related to the visual and dramatic arts.
 The Bethune Environmental Action Team (BEAT) works to spread awareness about pro-environmental ideas and has helped Bethune become a Platinum Certified Eco-school.
 The Bethune Environmental Action Team will not apply for 2013 Platinum Eco-Schools Certification because of Bill 115 that has now been passed (Putting Students First Act).
Healthy Schools is a committee that educates students and staff about healthy living though events promoting nutrition, mindfulness and exercise.
Bethune Yearbook is the team responsible for designing and preparing the yearbook.

Clubs 
Anime Club (Inactive)
 Art club
ASL Club
 Bethune Journal
 Bethune Outdoor Club
 Breakfast Club
 Bethune Environmental Action Team (BEAT)
 Cheer Team
 Chess Club
 Chinese Association
 Christian Fellowship
 Dance Troupe
 Debate Club
 DECA
 Design @ Bethune Team
 Drama Club
 Electronic Club
 GSA (Gay Straight Alliance)
 HOSA
 Library Helpers
 Math Club
 Prom Committee
 Reach
 Red Wiggler Team
 Science Club
 Spanish Club
 Young Woman On The Move
 WE Take Action Bethune

Athletics 
A variety of sports are offered through different seasons. Students may choose to participate in a maximum of 2 sports per season.

Fall 
Basketball
Cross-Country
Field Hockey
Golf
Rugby
Tennis
Volleyball

Winter 
Archery
Basketball
Cheerleading
Floorball
Volleyball
Wrestling
Curling

Spring 
Archery
Badminton
Baseball
Rugby
Soccer
Tennis
Track
Ultimate Frisbee

Competitions
DECA Regionals, Provincials, and ICDC 
ICDC 2013 - 10 Bethune students were finalists 
Mathematics Competitions:

Euclid Contest, Fermat Contest, Pascal Contest, Cayley contest, Fryer, Galois & Hypatia Contests, Canadian Open Mathematics Challenge, Purple Comet! Math Meet, Beaver Computing Challenge
Music Competitions:
MusicFest Canada, Ontario Band Association Festival, Ontario Vocal Festival, Georgian Bay Regional Musicfest, GTA Musicfest Jazz Festival
Science Competitions:
Sir Isaac Newton Physics, O.A.P.T. Physics Contest, Avogadro Chemistry Competition, Chem 13 Contest, National Biology Competition
Computer and Technology Competitions:
Canadian Computing Competition, ECCO Computing Competition, Skills Canada, HOSA

Awards 
Notable Awards given to the school and the students in it
 Platinum Certified Eco-school 
 Dr. Bette M. Stephenson Recognition of Achievement 
 Zildjian Outstanding Percussion Section Award 
I. Keith Mann Outstanding Band Director Award

Alumni 

 Derrick Rossi, professor, researcher and founder of Moderna 
 Jay Manuel, makeup artist, fashion photographer and creative director of the America's Next Top Model and Canada's Next Top Model'' TV shows
 Dwayne Morgan, spoken word artist
 Mike Ricci, retired ice hockey player
 Kevin Weekes, professional ice hockey player for the National Hockey League and CBC Sports commentator
 Nick Kypreos, retired professional ice hockey and hockey analyst.
 David Morland IV, professional golf player.
 Arnold Chan, Member of Parliament for Scarborough-Agincourt (2014-2017)

See also
List of high schools in Ontario
Mary Ward Catholic Secondary School

References

External links 
 Dr. Norman Bethune Collegiate Institute
BCI Clubs and Extracurriculars
 TDSB Profile

Norman Bethune
High schools in Toronto
Schools in the TDSB
Educational institutions established in 1979
1979 establishments in Ontario
Education in Scarborough, Toronto